The Union of Bulgarian National Legions (UBNL) ( (СБНЛ); Sayuz na Balgarskite Natsionalni Legioni (SBNL)), until 1935 the Union of the National Youth Legions (UNYL); Съюз на Младежките Национални Легиони (СМНЛ); Sayuz na Mladezhkite Natsionalni Legioni (SMNL), was an ultranationalist, pro-fascist, pro-Nazi, and right extremist organization in Bulgaria, which was active between 1932 and 1944.

The organization had ideology, close to fascism, including creation of a totalitarian one-party regime, ban of market economy and total control by the state over the economy and the society, anti-Semitism and hostility towards foreigners, anti-communism, etc. It demonstrated similarity to the Italian fascism and German Nazism, from which it "borrows" ideas, symbols, slogans.

It was initially founded as Union of the National Youth Legions, which gained popularity among youth by using propaganda methods, popular in Nazi Germany at that time, including a march from Sofia to Veliko Tarnovo. It rivaled for political support with other popular nationalist organizations such as the Ratniks and the National Social movement. By 1939 the already renamed UBNL had 75,000 members, and while in that year it was formally banned by the pro-German government of Tsar Boris III, it continued to function and was supporting the close alliance of Bulgaria to Nazi Germany.

In 1942 Hristo Lukov, a retired Bulgarian army lieutenant general and former minister of war, became head of the organization. Identifying itself as an extreme monarchist group, it sought unsuccessfully to work with the National Social Movement, before finally emerging as an opposition group that was largely supportive of Nazism, but nevertheless critical of Bogdan Filov's pro-Nazi government, which they defined as consisting of "capitalists, Judeo-Masons and Bolsheviks". SBNL was banned after the 1944 coup d'etat along with all other nationalist organizations and parties.

Bulgarian historians define the organization as containing the features of the far right. Besides Nikolay Poppetrov, quoted above, Rumen Daskalov describes it as "having a complete fascist character during the years of WWII", which includes "far nationalistic and chauvinistic, authoritarian and totalitarian ideas, but even more tenacious and irreconcilable to any party-parliamentary forms and liberal-individualistic ideas, but also –more characteristically– leadership and elitism, racism, anti-Semitism, etc."

A yearly march with torches, reminiscent of the Nazi marches from the 1930s, in commemoration of UBNL leader Hristo Lukov, is being organized by a far-right informal organization in Bulgaria, calling themselves Bulgarian National Union. The organization describes itself as "ideologically closest to the Union of Bulgarian National Legions".

See also
 Fascism in Bulgaria

References

Anti-communism in Bulgaria
Defunct political parties in Bulgaria
Nationalist parties in Bulgaria
Nazi parties
Political parties established in 1933
Fascist organizations
Banned far-right parties
Anti-communist organizations
Monarchism in Bulgaria